The New England Granite Works was a firm incorporated in Hartford, Connecticut on June 16, 1871 by James G. Batterson. It was notable for creating a large number of works in the New England area until it was dissolved on June 26, 1926.

Projects
 Samuel Colt Monument, Cedar Hill Cemetery, Hartford, Connecticut (1862–64), Randolph Rogers, sculptor, James G. Batterson, architect.
 Soldiers' National Monument, Gettysburg National Cemetery, Gettysburg, Pennsylvania (1866–69), Randolph Rogers, sculptor, George Keller, architect.
 Connecticut State Capitol, Hartford, Connecticut (1872–78), Richard M. Upjohn, architect.
  U.S. Soldier Monument, Antietam National Cemetery, Carl Conrads, sculptor, George Keller, architect (1876–80). Prior to being placed at the National Cemetery the statue was used as an "industrial exhibit" for the firm at the Centennial Exhibition in Philadelphia in 1876.
 Alexander Hamilton statue, Central Park, New York City (1880), Carl Conrads, sculptor.
 Thayer Monument, West Point, New York (1883), Carl Conrads, sculptor.
 Library of Congress, Washington, D.C. (1890–97), John L. Smithmeyer and Paul J. Pelz, architects.

Gallery

References

Companies established in 1871
Monumental masonry companies
Granite companies
Companies based in Hartford, Connecticut
1871 establishments in Connecticut